Turn the Key Softly is a 1951 novel by the British writer John Brophy. It follows the lives of three women in the first dozen hours after they are released from prison.

Adaptation
In 1953 it was made into a film of the same title directed by Jack Lee and starring Yvonne Mitchell, Joan Collins and Terence Morgan.

References

Bibliography
 Goble, Alan. The Complete Index to Literary Sources in Film. Walter de Gruyter, 1999.
 Watson, George & Willison, Ian R. The New Cambridge Bibliography of English Literature, Volume 4. CUP, 1972.

1951 British novels
British crime novels
British novels adapted into films
William Collins, Sons books
Novels by John Brophy
Novels set in London